Uranothauma cordatus is a butterfly in the family Lycaenidae. It is found in Uganda, the Democratic Republic of the Congo (the north-eastern part of the country to Kivu), Kenya and northern Tanzania. The habitat consists of montane areas at altitudes above 1,500 meters.

Adult males mud-puddle and have also been recorded on excrement.

References

Butterflies described in 1892
Uranothauma
Butterflies of Africa